In chess, the Smith–Morra Gambit (or simply Morra Gambit) is an opening gambit against the Sicilian Defence distinguished by the moves:
1. e4 c5
2. d4 cxd4
3. c3

White sacrifices a pawn to  quickly and create attacking chances. The plan for White is straightforward and consists of placing his bishop on c4 to attack the f7-square, and controlling both the c- and d- with rooks, taking advantage of the fact that Black can hardly find a suitable place to post his queen.

The Smith–Morra is uncommon in grandmaster games, but is popular at club level. It does not have a definitive refutation.

History
The Smith–Morra is named after  (1900–1969) from France, and Ken Smith (1930–1999) of the Dallas Chess Club. In Europe the name Morra Gambit is preferred; other names for it, including Tartakower Gambit and Matulovic Gambit, have disappeared.

Around 1950, Morra published a booklet and several articles about the Smith–Morra. Smith wrote a total of nine books and forty-nine articles about the gambit. When Smith participated in an international tournament against several top grandmasters in San Antonio in 1972, he essayed the opening three times, against Donald Byrne, Larry Evans, and Henrique Mecking, but lost all three games.

Many players consider the opening amateurish. International Master Marc Esserman is one of its leading advocates today.

Continuations overview
Black has a wide choice of reasonable defences after 1.e4 c5 2.d4 cxd4 3.c3. White sometimes plays 2.Nf3 and 3.c3, which depending on Black's response may rule out certain lines.  3.Qxd4 Nc6 4.Qe3 is the Sicilian Center Game, similar to the Center Game, 1.e4 e5 2.d4 exd4 3.Qxd4 Nc6 4.Qe3.

Morra Gambit Accepted: 3...dxc3

4.Nxc3
 Classical Main line: 4...Nc6 5.Nf3 d6 6.Bc4 e6 7.0-0 Nf6 8.Qe2 Be7 9.Rd1 e5 10.h3 or 10.Be3
 Scheveningen setup: 4...Nc6 5.Nf3 d6 6.Bc4 e6 7.0-0 Nf6 (or Be7) 8.Qe2 a6 9.Rd1 Qc7 (probably inferior Qa5) 10.Bf4 (10.Bg5) Be7
 Siberian Variation: 4...Nc6 5.Nf3 e6 6.Bc4 Nf6 and 7...Qc7, with the idea being after 7.0-0 Qc7 8.Qe2 Ng4!, 9.h3?? loses to the famous "Siberian Trap" 9...Nd4!, winning the queen. If instead White plays 9.Rd1, preventing 9...Nd4, Black can continue with 9...Bc5 with a clearly better game.
 Nge7 variations: 4...Nc6 (or 4...e6) 5.Nf3 e6 6.Bc4 a6 (Nge7) 7.0-0 Nge7 (d6 8.Qe2 Nge7 9.Bg5 h6) 8.Bg5 f6 9.Be3
 6...a6 Defence: 4...Nc6 5.Nf3 d6 6.Bc4 a6 eventually 7...Bg4
 Fianchetto: 4...g6 (4...Nc6 5.Nf3 g6 allows 6.h4!?) 5.Nf3 Bg7 6.Bc4 Nc6
 Chicago Defence: 4...e6 5.Bc4 a6 6.Nf3 b5 7.Bb3 d6 8.0-0 and Black plays ...Ra7 at some stage
 Early queenside fianchetto: 4...e6 5.Bc4 a6 6.Nf3 b5 7.Bb3 Bb7
Finegold Defence 4..d6 5. Nf3 e6 6. Bc4 Nf6 7. 0-0 Be7 8. Qe2 a6

4.Bc4
This line is similar to the Danish Gambit: 4...cxb2 5.Bxb2

Morra Gambit Declined
 Advance Variation: 3...d3
 First transposition to the Alapin: 3...Nf6 4.e5 Nd5
 Second transposition to the Alapin: 3...d5 4.exd5 Qxd5 (Nf6) 5.cxd4

The latter has a bad reputation, as square c3 is free for the knight. Still 5...Nf6 (5...e5; 5...Nc6 6.Nf3 e5) 6.Nf3 e6 7.Nc3 Qd6 is likely to transpose to a main line of the Alapin: 2.c3 d5 3.exd5 Qxd5 4.d4 e6 5.Nf3 Nf6 6.Bd3 Nc6 7.0-0 cxd4 8.cxd4 Be7 9.Nc3 Qd6.

See also
 Another anti-Sicilian gambit is the Wing Gambit (1.e4 c5 2.b4).
 List of chess openings
 List of chess openings named after people

Notes

References

Further reading

External links
The Smith–Morra gambit

Chess openings
1950 in chess